Qaleh Bin (also Romanized as Qal‘eh Bīn and Qal‘eh Beyn; also known as Qal‘eh bin Watkeh) is a village in Lisar Rural District, Kargan Rud District, Talesh County, Gilan Province, Iran. At the 2006 census, its population was 1,399, in 343 families.

References 

Populated places in Talesh County